The 2013 BNP Paribas Open (also known as the 2013 Indian Wells Masters) was a professional tennis tournament that was played at Indian Wells, California, in March 2013. It was the 40th edition of the men's event (25th for the women), known as the BNP Paribas Open, and was classified as an ATP World Tour Masters 1000 event on the 2013 ATP World Tour and a Premier Mandatory event on the 2013 WTA Tour. Both the men's and the women's events took place at the Indian Wells Tennis Garden in Indian Wells, United States, from March 7 through March 17, 2013, and were played on outdoor hard courts.

Points and prize money

Point distribution

Prize money
The 2013 BNP Paribas Open will feature a significant increase in prize money from the previous year, with all players competing for a share of $5,244,125. All prize money is in US Dollars.

Players

Men's singles

Seeds

 1 Rankings are as of March 4, 2013.

Other entrants
The following players got wildcards into the singles main draw:
 James Blake
 Steve Johnson
 Tommy Robredo
 Tim Smyczek
 Jack Sock

The following players received entry from the qualifying draw:
 Daniel Brands
 Matthew Ebden
 Ernests Gulbis
 Ivo Karlović
 Daniel Muñoz de la Nava
 Wayne Odesnik
 Guido Pella
 Philipp Petzschner
 Vasek Pospisil
 Bobby Reynolds
 Dmitry Tursunov
 Mischa Zverev

Withdrawals
Before the tournament
  Brian Baker → replaced by  Lleyton Hewitt
  Andy Roddick → replaced by  Evgeny Donskoy
  Radek Štěpánek → replaced by  Tatsuma Ito
  Grega Žemlja → replaced by  David Nalbandian

During the tournament
  Michaël Llodra (hip injury)
  Leonardo Mayer (back injury)

Men's doubles

Seeds

1 Rankings as of March 4, 2013.

Other entrants
The following pairs received wildcards into the doubles main draw:
  James Blake /  Mardy Fish
  Andy Murray /  Jamie Murray

Withdrawals
Before the tournament
  Marcos Baghdatis (shoulder injury)
  Thomaz Bellucci (shoulder injury)
  Leander Paes (flu)
  Horia Tecău (calf injury)

Women's singles

Seeds

 1 Rankings are as of February 25, 2013.

Other entrants
The following players got wildcards into the singles main draw:
  Jill Craybas
  Kimiko Date-Krumm 
  Madison Keys
  Bethanie Mattek-Sands
  Kristina Mladenovic
  Shahar Pe'er
  Maria Sanchez
  Taylor Townsend

The following player received entry using a protected ranking into the singles main draw:
  Alexandra Dulgheru

The following players received entry from the qualifying draw:
  Mallory Burdette
  Casey Dellacqua
  Stéphanie Foretz Gacon
  Sesil Karatantcheva
  Michelle Larcher de Brito 
  Mirjana Lučić-Baroni
  Grace Min
  Garbiñe Muguruza
  Olga Puchkova
  Monica Puig
  Elina Svitolina
  Lesia Tsurenko

The following player received entry as a lucky loser:
  Stefanie Vögele

Withdrawals
Before the tournament
  Petra Cetkovská → replaced by  Lauren Davis
  Camila Giorgi (right shoulder injury) →  replaced by Stefanie Vögele
  Kaia Kanepi → replaced by  Polona Hercog
  Li Na (left ankle injury) → replaced by  Ksenia Pervak
  Sabine Lisicki → replaced by  Melanie Oudin
  Anna Tatishvili → replaced by  Sílvia Soler Espinosa
  Serena Williams (continued boycott of the event since 2001) → replaced by  Mandy Minella
  Venus Williams (continued boycott of the event since 2001) → replaced by  Lara Arruabarrena
  Aleksandra Wozniak → replaced by  Alexandra Dulgheru

During the tournament
  Victoria Azarenka (right ankle injury)
  Samantha Stosur (right calf injury)

Women's doubles

Seeds

1 Rankings as of February 25, 2013.

Other entrants
The following pairs received wildcards into the doubles main draw:
  Jelena Janković /  Mirjana Lučić-Baroni
  Angelique Kerber /  Andrea Petkovic
  Svetlana Kuznetsova /  Flavia Pennetta
  Petra Kvitová /  Yanina Wickmayer

Champions

Men's singles

 Rafael Nadal def.  Juan Martín del Potro, 4–6, 6–3, 6–4
This was Nadal's 3rd singles title at Indian Wells and 3rd overall, and it was his 53rd title, a record-breaking 22nd ATP World Tour Masters 1000 title.

Women's singles

 Maria Sharapova def.  Caroline Wozniacki 6–2, 6–2
This was Sharapova's second Indian Wells title and 28th career title

Men's doubles

 Bob Bryan /  Mike Bryan def.  Treat Conrad Huey /  Jerzy Janowicz 6–3, 3–6, [10–6]

Women's doubles

 Ekaterina Makarova /  Elena Vesnina def.  Nadia Petrova /  Katarina Srebotnik 6–0, 5–7, [10–6]

References

External links

Association of Tennis Professionals (ATP) tournament profile

 
2013
BNP Paribas Open
BNP Paribas Open
2013 in American tennis
BNP Paribas